The Clichy criteria are a group of criteria proposed in determining the survival of individuals with acute liver failure. It was based on a study of patients presenting with viral hepatitis, of which individuals with the lowest survival were identified.

Two criteria predicted the prognosis of patients with poor survival:
 Factor V level less than 20 percent of its normal value in individuals less than thirty years of age
 Factor V level less than 30 percent of its normal value in individuals greater than thirty years of age.

The positive predictive value of mortality was 82% and the negative predictive value of mortality was 98% in individuals meeting these criteria.

See also
 King's College Criteria

References

Hepatology
Gastroenterology